Green Europe (EV), officially Green Europe – Greens (Europa Verde – Verdi), is a green political party in Italy. Its leaders are Angelo Bonelli, long-time leader of the former Federation of the Greens, and Eleonora Evi, a former member of the Five Star Movement. It was established as an electoral list to take part to the 2019 European Parliament election in connection with the European Green Party. Its founding members were the Federation of the Greens, Green Italia, Possible and, locally, the Greens of South Tyrol.

Since 2019, EV has fielded candidates under its symbol in several regional and local elections. EV became a full-fledged political party in July 2021.

History 
In the early stages of the campaign for the 2019 European Parliament election, the Federation of the Greens and Green Italia formed an agreement with Italia in Comune of Federico Pizzarotti to form an electoral list for the 2019 European Parliament election. However, in March, Italia in Comune abandoned the alliance with the Greens, instead joining More Europe. The Greens subsequently made an agreement with Beatrice Brignone's Possible, whose members approved it in a vote. The Greens of South Tyrol also joined the alliance.

After that an article by Il Foglio reported that two candidates on the alliance's electoral list, Giuliana Farinaro and Elvira Maria Vernengo, had received support from the Green Front (led by Vincenzo Galizia, former leader of the youth section of the neo-fascist Tricolour Flame party), Giuseppe Civati informally withdrew his candidacy and suspended his election campaign.

The list received 2.3% of the vote, which was an improvement from 2014 but still not enough to exceed the 4% threshold for proportional representation in the European Parliament. Civati received the most votes of the list, with 12,247 preference votes.

In the 2020 regional elections, EV won seats in Veneto, Marche and Campania.

In July 2021, EV became a full-fledged political party, with Angelo Bonelli and Eleonora Evi as its leaders.

In the 2021 local elections, EV won 0.9% of the vote in Rome, 5.1% in Milan, 3.2% in Naples, 0.9% in Turin and 2.8% in Bologna.

In January 2022, EV and Italian Left (SI) formed a "consultation pact", aimed at co-operating on the 2022 Italian presidential election held in late January. In that context, the two parties decided to jointly support Luigi Manconi, a former lawmaker for the Federation of the Greens, the Democrats of the Left, and the Democratic Party (PD) and expert on human rights issues. In June 2022, SI's national assembly formally approved the alliance with EV.

In February 2022 four deputies, all former members of the populist Five Star Movement (M5S), formed the "Green Europe" sub-group in the Mixed Group of the Chamber of Deputies: Devis Dori, Cristian Romaniello, Paolo Nicolò Romano and Elisa Siragusa. In March a fifth deputy and former member of the M5S, Rosa Menga, joined the party.

In July 2022, EV and SI held a joint convention in Rome named "New Energies", promoting their cooperation and a unitary electoral program. The alliance deliberately took inspiration from the New Ecologic and Social People's Union, the left-wing list formed in the run-up of the 2022 French legislative election. Following the fall of Draghi's government, the early dissolution of the Italian Parliament and the calling of the 2022 general election, the AVS was officially launched and its logo presented. On 6 August 2022, the alliance formalised an electoral agreement with the PD.

Original composition 
On the occasion of the 2019 European Parliament election the list was composed of the following parties:

Electoral results

Italian Parliament

European Parliament

Regional Councils

Leadership 
Spokespersons: Angelo Bonelli / Eleonora Evi (2021–present)
Presidents of the Federal Council: Marco Boato / Fiorella Zabatta (2021–present)

References 

2019 establishments in Italy
Federation of the Greens
Green political parties in Italy
Left-wing parties in Europe
Left-wing politics in Italy
Political parties established in 2019
Progressive parties in Italy